San Antonio de Ibarra is a city in northern Ecuador that lies at the foot of the Imbabura Volcano and on the left bank of the Tahuando River in Imbabura Province.

History
The city was founded in 1683, but there is evidence of human settlement from 100 years before.

Culture 

San Antonio is famous for its wood artisans. For this is called also the Capital of wood artisans. Pope Francis, during his July 2015 visit to Ecuador, received a wood sculpture made by Jorge Villalba, born in San Antonio, as a gift.

Monuments
 Cathedral
 Episcopal church
 Imbabura Volcano

People born in San Antonio 

 Leonidas Proaño, (1910-1988) bishop

References

External links
  San Antonio de Ibarra page in Ecos Travel
 Ibarra Travel Information

Populated places in Imbabura Province
Populated places established in 1683
1683 establishments in the Spanish Empire